Puzzles Like You is the fifth and final studio album by the British country rock-folk group Mojave 3, released on 19 June 2006. The album was regarded as taking the band away from their old sound and leading into a more uptempo style. It was released to fair reviews, averaging a 69 on Metacritic.

Track listing
 "Truck Driving Man" – 3:33
 "Puzzles Like You" – 2:16
 "Breaking The Ice" – 4:06
 "Running With Your Eyes Closed" – 2:13
 "Most Days" – 4:24
 "Big Star Baby" – 4:20
 "Ghostship Waiting" – 3:07
 "Kill The Lights" – 3:15
 "You Said It Before" – 3:50
 "To Hold Your Tiny Toes" – 3:27
 "Just A Boy" – 3:03
 "The Mutineer" – 3:42

Singles
 "Breaking the Ice" (5 June 2006)
 CD single, BAD 2602CD; 7" vinyl, AD 2602
 "Breaking The Ice"
 "Star In The Sky"
 "Bright Lights"
 "Puzzles Like You" (6 November 2006)
 Digital single, EAD 2615S; 7" vinyl, AD 2615
 "Puzzles Like You"
 "Bad World"
 "In Your Head"

References

2006 albums
Mojave 3 albums
4AD albums